Villa San José is a hamlet (caserío) in the Canelones Department of southern Uruguay.

Location

Population
In 2011 Villa San José had a population of 1,419.
 
Source: Instituto Nacional de Estadística de Uruguay

References

External links
INE map of Villa Crespo y San Andrés, Toledo, Fracc.Camino del Andaluz y R.84, Joaquín Suárez, Fracc.sobre Ruta 74, Villa San José, Villa San Felipe, Villa Hadita, Seis Hermanos and Villa Porvenir

Populated places in the Canelones Department